Johanne is an Old French equivalent of Joanna that is now a common French Canadian female given name.

Johanne as a given name
Johanne Bégin (born 1971), Canadian waterpolo player
Johanne Brekke, Welsh sport shooter
Johanne Deschamps (born 1959), Canadian politician
Johanne Falardeau, Canadian badminton player
Johanne Luise Heiberg (née Pätges) (1812–1890), Danish actress
Johanne “Bertha” Schippan (1888-1902), Australian murder victim
Johanne Morissette Daug Amon-Lamar (born 1996), a.k.a. "Morissette", is a Filipina singer, songwriter, producer and former actress

See also
Joanne (given name)

Given names